Yasser El Hajj (born 18 August 1970) is a former Lebanese basketball player. He is the head coach of the Lebanese American University (LAU) Women Basketball Team. El Hajj, alongside former teammate Walid Doumiati, helped  Sporting Al Riyadi Beirut after entering the title race with Beirut rivals Hekmeh BC. Yasser also competed for the Lebanon national basketball team in the 2001 ABC Championship.

Personal life
After announcing his retirement in the 2004–2005 season with Champville SC, Yasser was elected as the Minister of Sports and Youth.

References

1970 births
Living people
Lebanese men's basketball players
Power forwards (basketball)
Al Riyadi Club Beirut basketball players